The 1935 Gent–Wevelgem was the second edition of the Gent–Wevelgem cycle race and was held on 30 June 1935. The race started in Ghent and finished in Wevelgem.

General classification

References

Gent–Wevelgem
1935 in road cycling
1935 in Belgian sport
June 1935 sports events